Seven Compositions 1978 is an album by composer Anthony Braxton recorded in Paris in 1979 by a quartet and originally released on the Moers Music label.

Reception

The Allmusic review by Brian Olewnick stated: "Seven Compositions (1978) is, overall, a fine documentation of one of Braxton's less heralded bands and a fine compendium of works in its own right, providing a good portrait of the state of his musical concerns at the time."

Track listing
All compositions by Anthony Braxton are graphically titled and the following attempts to translate the title to text.

 "2643 K-8--W-B [Composition 69 G]" - 7:25
 "W6 4N R6 AH0 [Composition 40 F]" - 9:55
 "36 SB7 M-36 [Composition 69 M]" - 3:14
 "ANNF (GM-6)--30 [Composition 40 D]" - 5:28
 "F04(G)WN OQO-26-- [Composition 40 I]" - 3:57 
 "---(W6 N6) - K8-4 [Composition 69 H]" - 7:35
 "---GM2 (OSM-40) - GRK [Composition 69 K]" - 2:05

Personnel
Anthony Braxton - alto saxophone, soprano saxophone, E♭ soprano saxophone, contrabass clarinet, soprano clarinet, clarinet
Ray Anderson - trombone, alto trombone, cornet
John Lindberg - bass
Thurman Barker - drums, marimba, bells

References

Moers Music albums
Anthony Braxton albums
1979 albums